Unruly Child is an American hard rock band, founded in 1991.

Band members

Principal members
 Marcie Free – lead vocals (1991-1992, 2010-present)
 Bruce Gowdy – guitar, bass, drums, keyboards, vocals (1991-1992, 1998-2003, 2010-present)
 Larry Antonino – bass (1991-1992, 2010-present)
 Jay Schellen – drums (1991-1992, 1998-2002, 2010-present)
 Guy Allison – keyboards, bass, drums, percussion, vocals (1991-1992, 1998-2003, 2010-present)

Former members
 Kelly Hansen – lead vocals, guitar (1998-2002)
 Ricky Phillips – bass (1998-2002)
 Phillip Bardowell – lead vocals (2002-2003)

Discography

Studio albums
Unruly Child (1992)
Tormented (1995) as Marcie Free
Waiting for the Sun (1998)
UCIII (2003)
Worlds Collide (2010)
Down the Rabbit Hole (2014)
Can't Go Home (2017)
Big Blue World (2019)
Our Glass House (2020)

Live albums
Unhinged Live from Milan (2018)

Compilation albums
The Basement Demos (2002)

Box sets
Reigning Frogs – The Box Set Collection (2017)

References

Musical groups from Los Angeles
Musical groups established in 1991
1991 establishments in California